Valyantsin Byalkevich (27 January 1973 – 1 August 2014), also referred to as Valiantsin Bialkevich, was a Belarusian professional footballer who played as a midfielder. He spent the majority of his career with Ukrainian club Dynamo Kyiv, where he was predominantly used as a playmaker, and was part of the team that reached the semi-finals of 1998–99 UEFA Champions League.

Career

Club
In September 1994 while playing for FC Dinamo Minsk, Byalkevich was banned from European competitions for one year by UEFA after testing positive for anabolic steroids following a UEFA Cup match.

International
In October 2005, Byalkevich retired from the Belarus national team, having scored 10 goals, while being capped 56 times.

Personal life
Byalkevich married Ukrainian pop singer Anna Sedokova in 2004. They had a daughter on 8 December 2004 and divorced in 2006. In 2008, he accepted Ukrainian citizenship and continued to work in the Dynamo Kyiv football academy.

Death
Byalkevich died on 1 August 2014, after suffering an aneurysm.

Career statistics
Scores and results list Belarusia's goal tally first, score column indicates score after each Byalkevich goal.

Honors
Dinamo Minsk
 Belarusian Premier League: 1992, 1992–93, 1993–94, 1994–95, 1995
 Belarusian Cup: 1992, 1993–94

Dynamo Kyiv
 Ukrainian Premier League (9): 1995–96, 1996–97, 1997–98, 1998–99, 1999–2000, 2000–01, 2002–03, 2003–04, 2006–07
 Ukrainian Cup (8): 1996, 1998, 1999, 2000, 2003, 2005, 2006, 2007
 Ukrainian Super Cup: 2004, 2006

Individual
 Belarusian Footballer of the Year: 1995
 Komanda: 2001, 2003

References

External links
 
 Valentin Byalkevich profile on Dynamo Kyiv official website 
 
 

1973 births
2014 deaths
Footballers from Minsk
Soviet footballers
Belarusian footballers
Association football midfielders
Belarus international footballers
FC Dinamo Minsk players
Soviet Top League players
Belarusian Premier League players
FC Dynamo Kyiv players
FC Dynamo-2 Kyiv players
FC Dynamo-3 Kyiv players
Shamakhi FK players
Ukrainian Premier League players
Ukrainian First League players
Ukrainian Second League players
Belarusian football managers
Dynamo Kyiv Football Academy managers
Deaths from aneurysm
Doping cases in association football
Belarusian expatriate footballers
Belarusian expatriate football managers
Belarusian expatriate sportspeople in Ukraine
Expatriate footballers in Ukraine
Expatriate football managers in Ukraine
Belarusian expatriate sportspeople in Azerbaijan
Expatriate footballers in Azerbaijan
Burials at Baikove Cemetery